Paul Joseph O'Neil (born August 24, 1953) is an American former professional ice hockey center. He was drafted by the Vancouver Canucks in the fifth round, 67th overall, of the 1973 NHL Amateur Draft. He was also drafted by the Houston Aeros in the fifth round, 61st overall, of the 1973 WHA Amateur Draft. O'Neil played six National Hockey League games in his career (five with Vancouver and one with the Boston Bruins) and one World Hockey Association game (with the Birmingham Bulls), spending the bulk of his career in the minor leagues. Internationally he played for the United States at the 1973 World Championship Group B.

Career statistics

Regular season and playoffs

International

External links

1953 births
American men's ice hockey centers
Binghamton Dusters players
Birmingham Bulls players
Boston Bruins players
Boston University Terriers men's ice hockey players
Hampton Aces players
Hampton Gulls (AHL) players
Hampton Gulls (SHL) players
Houston Aeros draft picks
Ice hockey people from Boston
Living people
Nashville South Stars (ACHL) players
Rochester Americans players
Salem Raiders players
San Diego Mariners (PHL) players
Seattle Totems (CHL) players
Seattle Totems (WHL) players
Vancouver Canucks draft picks
Vancouver Canucks players
Virginia Lancers (ACHL) players